Elena Jane Goulding (born 30 December 1986) is an English singer and songwriter. Her career began when she met record producers Starsmith and Frankmusik, and she was later spotted by Jamie Lillywhite, who became her manager and A&R. After signing to Polydor Records in July 2009, Goulding released her debut extended play, An Introduction to Ellie Goulding, later that year.

In 2010, she became the second artist to top the BBC's annual Sound of... poll and win the Critics' Choice Award at the Brit Awards in the same year.

Goulding's second studio album, Halcyon was released in 2012 and preceded by its lead single "Anything Could Happen". Halcyon Days, a repackaged edition of Halcyon, was released in 2013 and produced the single "Burn", which became her first  single in the UK. At the 2014 Brit Awards, she received the award for British Female Solo Artist. Goulding released her third studio album, Delirium, in 2015, with "On My Mind" as the album's lead single. That year, she received her first Grammy Award nomination for Best Pop Solo Performance for her single "Love Me like You Do". Her fourth studio album, Brightest Blue (2020), became her third album to top the UK Albums Chart, and her fourth consecutive RIAA–certified album.

Early life
Elena Jane Goulding was born on 30 December 1986 in Hereford, Herefordshire, England to Arthur and Tracey Goulding, and was brought up in the small village of Lyonshall, in Herefordshire. She has a brother, Alex, and two sisters, Isabel and Jordan. When she was five years old, her parents separated. Afterwards, she had little contact with her father, a funeral director. Goulding and her siblings were raised by their mother on a council estate, with Goulding describing the family as "super poor". She stated that she has a "difficult" relationship with her mother.

Goulding began playing the clarinet at age nine and learning guitar at age 14. She attended Lady Hawkins' High School in Kington, Herefordshire and, by the age of 15, started writing songs. She took A levels in English, Politics, Drama and Music, and passed the first 3 with "A" grades but failed music. After enrolling on a degree in Drama and Theatre Studies at the University of Kent and remaining until her final year, she met Jamie Lillywhite. He became her manager and introduced her to the producer Starsmith, who would become her chief collaborator and the primary producer of Lights.

Career

2009–2011: Lights and Bright Lights

Although Ellie Goulding signed to Polydor Records in July 2009, her debut single, "Under the Sheets", was released through the independent label Neon Gold Records, appearing digitally in the United Kingdom on 15 November 2009. "Wish I Stayed" was available as a free download as Single of the Week on iTunes Store UK from 22 to 28 December 2009.

Before the release of her debut album, Goulding won the BBC Sound of 2010 poll, which showcases the music industry's top choices for rising stars. She also won the Critics' Choice Award at the 2010 Brit Awards, making her the second artist to win both in the same year.
Goulding co-wrote "Love Me 'Cause You Want To" for Gabriella Cilmi's second album, Ten, and three songs ("Remake Me + You", "Notice", "Jumping into Rivers") for Diana Vickers's debut album, Songs from the Tainted Cherry Tree. Her song "Not Following" was used by German singer Lena on her debut album My Cassette Player. Goulding was featured on rapper Tinie Tempah's single "Wonderman" from his debut studio album Disc-Overy (2010).

As of June 2012, the album had sold over 850,000 copies in the UK and 1.6 million copies worldwide. In August 2010, she released a second EP, Run into the Light, containing remixes of songs from Lights. The album was supported by Nike and was released through Polydor as a running soundtrack in an effort to get her music taken up by the running subculture. In November 2010, Lights was re-released as Bright Lights, with six new tracks added. It was originally announced that the lead single from Bright Lights would be the new edit of the title track with a release scheduled for 1 November 2010. This plan was ultimately scrapped to allow her cover of Elton John's "Your Song" to be released in conjunction with the John Lewis Christmas advert in the UK in 2010. The single became her second highest-charting single to date, reaching  on the UK Singles Chart. It also charted in some European countries. In January 2011, it was announced that the title track from Lights would serve as the second single from Bright Lights.

Goulding toured in support of Lights and supported Passion Pit in March 2010 and John Mayer during his British tour in May 2010. During the summer she performed at a number of festivals. On 29 May she performed at the Dot to Dot Festival in Bristol. She performed a set on 25 June at the Glastonbury Festival 2010 on the John Peel Stage. Her third EP was a live recording of part of her set at the iTunes Festival 2010. The whole set was ultimately included as bonus content on the iTunes version of Bright Lights. She made her T in the Park debut on 11 July.
In early 2011, she recorded an original song for the film Life in a Day. In February 2011, she returned to the Brit Awards where she was nominated for Best British Female and Best British Breakthrough Act but lost out to Laura Marling and to Tinie Tempah.

In April 2011, Goulding played live at the Coachella Valley Music and Arts Festival. She also made her American television debut on Jimmy Kimmel Live! on 7 April 2011 performing "Starry Eyed". She appeared as the musical guest on the 700th episode of the Saturday Night Live, broadcast 7 May 2011 and hosted by Tina Fey. She performed at the wedding reception of Prince William and Kate Middleton on 29 April 2011, and performed what she recalled as "about 14 songs", including her cover of "Your Song".

Goulding collaborated with American electronic artist and producer Skrillex on a song titled "Summit", included on his 2011 EP Bangarang. She travelled with Skrillex on his South American tour
She headlined the 2011 Wakestock Festival in Wales, performing on 8 July. In August, she performed at the V Festival for her second year in a row.
Following the re-release of Lights and the American release of the album, Goulding said she would soon begin work on a second studio album with an expected release of September 2011.
On 6 August 2011, she performed at Lollapalooza in Chicago. She performed at the annual Nobel Peace Prize Concert on 11 December 2011 in Oslo, Norway. On 1 December 2011, she performed at the White House during the National Christmas Tree lighting, alongside Big Time Rush and will.i.am. On 19 September 2011, it was announced that she would open for Katy Perry's California Dreams Tour, replacing Jessie J who withdrew due to a foot injury.

2012–2014: Halcyon and Halcyon Days

In 2012, Goulding appeared on "Fall into the Sky" from Zedd's debut album Clarity and on Calvin Harris's song "I Need Your Love" which is included on Halcyon and also Harris's album 18 Months. On 10 July 2012, Goulding released a cover of Active Child's song "Hanging On", featuring Tinie Tempah, as a free download on her SoundCloud page. In late July 2012, it was announced that Goulding's second album is titled Halcyon and it would be released on 8 October 2012. The album was preceded by the lead single "Anything Could Happen" on 21 August. The lyric video for "Anything Could Happen" premiered on 9 August 2012, consisting of a series of fan-submitted Instagram pictures.
On 19 November 2012, the music video for Goulding's second single from Halcyon, titled "Figure 8" was released. The single was released digitally in the UK on 12 December 2012.

Goulding contributed a track titled "Bittersweet" (produced by Skrillex) to the soundtrack of The Twilight Saga: Breaking Dawn – Part 2, released on 13 November 2012.
It was announced on 12 February 2013, that in May 2013, she would be supporting Bruno Mars on his Moonshine Jungle World Tour on selected dates.
On 20 May 2013, Goulding announced she would embark on a seven-date tour in the UK during October that year. On 28 May 2013, Goulding's cover of Alt-J's song "Tessellate" was released via her SoundCloud page. Goulding has also been reported to have filmed a music video for this track in Paris earlier that month. She claimed to be "making a video for a song that isn't on my record".
In June 2013, Goulding performed at previous festivals and concerts including RockNess festival in Inverness, Capital FM Summertime Ball and Firefly Music Festival at The Woodlands in Dover, Delaware.
On 2 July 2013, Goulding premiered a song titled "You My Everything" in the first episode of Skins Fire and that same day Goulding confirmed to Elle magazine that Halcyon would be re-released later that year.

On 5 July 2013, Digital Spy confirmed the release of Halcyon Days, a repackaged edition of Halcyon, which was released on 23 August 2013. The re-release, featuring ten additional tracks, was preceded by the single "Burn", which had been uploaded to Goulding's SoundCloud page the previous day. On 7 July 2013, the official music video for "Burn" premiered on Goulding's Vevo channel on YouTube. "Burn" became Goulding's first single to top the UK's Official Singles Chart.
Goulding was performing at V Festival Chelmsford when news of her first UK  broke; Rita Ora surprised Goulding with her Official Number 1 Award.
On 9 September 2013, Goulding released a music video for "How Long Will I Love You" for the film About Time. Goulding appeared on the soundtrack for the film The Hunger Games: Catching Fire with the track "Mirror".
On 15 October 2013, Goulding confirmed on Fearne Cotton's radio show that "How Long Will I Love You" would be the next single for BBC's Children in Need. On the same day, the Active Child song "Silhouette", on which Goulding features, was also released. On 28 October 2013, Goulding posted an alternative video of "How Long Will I Love You" on her Vevo channel for the short film Tom & Issy, in which she also stars. On the final episode of The X Factor on 14 December, Goulding performed a duet with finalist Luke Friend.

On 5 January 2014, Goulding premiered the music video for her song "Goodness Gracious" on her Vevo channel, later confirming that it would be her sixth single released from Halcyon Days. On 22 January 2014, Goulding confirmed through her Facebook page that she had contributed the song "Beating Heart" to the soundtrack for the film Divergent, based on the novel of the same name by Veronica Roth.
On 3 February 2014, Goulding released a cover of the James Blake song "Life Round Here" featuring rapper Angel Haze through her SoundCloud page. On 19 February, Goulding won Best British Female Solo Artist at the 2014 Brit Awards.
On 20 October 2014, she stated via Facebook that she will appear on the new Calvin Harris album, Motion, with a new song called "Outside". The song was released as the album's fourth single on 20 October 2014. Goulding also featured in Iggy Azalea's song "Heavy Crown", which was released on 21 November 2014 on Azalea's Reclassified, a reissue of her debut album The New Classic.

2015–2017: Delirium
In November 2014, Goulding announced that she was focusing on a third studio album. In early 2015, Goulding released the song "Love Me like You Do", which was featured in the soundtrack to the film Fifty Shades of Grey, adapted from the erotic novel of the same name. The video was released to YouTube on 22 January, to precede an official release date of 15 February. The single held the record for the most-streamed track in a single week in the United Kingdom (streamed 2.58 million times), and worldwide (streamed 15.5 million times). On 7 December 2015, "Love Me like You Do" earned Goulding a Grammy Award nomination for Best Pop Solo Performance. In the nominations for the 2016 Brit Awards announced on 14 January 2016, the song was among the nominees for British Single of the Year, and Best British Video. Goulding starred in the music video for Taylor Swift's song "Bad Blood", which was released in May 2015.

Goulding appeared on the Major Lazer album Peace Is the Mission on the track "Powerful", alongside Tarrus Riley. The track was released together with the album on 1 June 2015. A preview of the single was revealed on 23 April 2015. Having finished recording new material on 27 July 2015, Goulding tweeted a link to an Instagram post of her leaving Abbey Road Studios captioned, "That's a wrap!". On 5 August 2015 at the iHeartRadio Music Summit, Interscope unveiled the title of Goulding's new single, "On My Mind". A preview of the new track was released online via Goulding's Facebook page on 15 September 2015, with a confirmed single release date of 17 September 2015. The following day, another video teaser was uploaded revealing the title and cover art for Goulding's third studio album, Delirium.

On 7 September 2015, it was announced that Goulding would be performing at the 2015 AFL Grand Final, along with Canadian musician Bryan Adams and American musician Chris Isaak. On 17 September, Goulding debuted her single, "On My Mind", the lead track from Delirium, on BBC Radio 1's Breakfast Show. She also announced that Delirium would be released on 6 November. Goulding subsequently performed "On My Mind" at the Apple Music Festival later that week.

She also appeared on the Australian X Factor on 6 October where she performed "On My Mind". On 15 October 2015, it was announced that "Army" would serve as the second official single from the album; the song's music video was later released on 14 January 2016. Third single, "Something in the Way You Move" was first released as a promotional single from the album on 9 October 2015. It was then released on 19 January 2016, its original music video was released on 23 February 2016 and other music video directed by Emil Nava was released on 21 June 2017.

On 19 August 2016 she released the song "Still Falling for You" for the soundtrack to the film Bridget Jones's Baby, and its music video premiered on 25 August 2016. It received moderate commercial success worldwide managing to reach number 11 in the UK.

After a long gap, in 2017, she performed at the opening of 16th edition of Mawazine Festival, held in Rabat from 12 to 20 May. The event saw the debut live performance of her Kygo collaboration "First Time", which was released on 28 April.

2018–2021: Brightest Blue
In 2018, Goulding joined Tap Management after almost a decade with First Access Management. She appeared on a collaboration with Sean Paul on his Mad Love the Prequel EP titled "Bad Love", released on 29 June 2018.

Goulding collaborated with Diplo and Swae Lee on the single "Close to Me", which was released on 24 October 2018. On 1 January 2019, The Guardian reported that she has been working on her fourth album, set to release in the same year. On 1 March, she released the next single "Flux". She said regarding the album, "It's very much written by me".

On 12 April 2019, Goulding released the single "Sixteen". Goulding said of the single, "...That age was such a pivotal year for me in many ways and this song is so close to my heart. It takes me back to the reckless days of being a teenager and I hope it reminds us all about the innocence of youth."

Goulding released "Hate Me" with American rapper Juice Wrld on 26 June 2019. It was premiered by Zane Lowe as his 'World Record' on Beats 1. In July, Goulding stated that her next material to be released would be the songs "Woman I Am" and "Start". In November, she released her rendition of Joni Mitchell's Christmas song "River", which topped the UK Singles Chart, becoming her third UK number one single and the last UK number one song of the 2010s.

On 13 March 2020, Goulding released the new single "Worry About Me" which was created in-collaboration with Blackbear. In a radio interview with Heart the same month, she revealed that the album "kind of comes in two parts", adding that "the first side is something written entirely by me which was fun and I wrote most of it in New York when I was living there a few years back. I play the guitar and I play the bass and piano and then I'm singing a lot of vocals. It's very classically influenced because I love classical music. There's a lot going on, it's a big soundscape and one big film. The second half is my kind of alter ego songs." 
On 21 May she released single "Power" and on 30 June single "Slow Grenade" with Lauv.

Goulding released her fourth studio album, Brightest Blue, on 17 July 2020. Originally scheduled for 5 June 2020, the album's release was delayed due to the COVID-19 pandemic. The album debuted at the top of the UK Album Chart, becoming Goulding's third album to do so, as well as at No. 2 in Scotland. It reached the top 10 in Ireland as well as the top 40 in over ten countries including Australia, Germany and the United States.

Goulding announced on an Instagram Q&A that she would be releasing new music which was not part of the Brightest Blue era at the end of January 2021. On 21 January, she released a collaboration with electronic duo Silk City, titled "New Love". On 30 September, Goulding performed "Anything Could Happen" as part of the opening ceremony for Expo 2020, held in Dubai.

2022–present: Higher Than Heaven
On 19 June 2022, Goulding performed at Rock in Rio in Lisbon, Portugal. After the concert, she announced that she would be releasing new music in July. The following day, she blacked out all her social media profiles. Back in July 2021, during an interview with Joe Wicks, she described the forthcoming album as "a dance record. It's electronic pop, a dance thing from outer space". On 4 July 2022, she announced the release of "Easy Lover" featuring Big Sean, which was released on 15 July. The single did not enter the UK Singles Top 100, but peaked at number 31 on the UK Singles Downloads Chart Top 100. It was followed by "All by Myself", a collaboration between Goulding and producers Alok and Sigala, on 7 October. Goulding released the single "Let It Die" along with its video on 19 October and announced the same day that her fifth studio album Higher Than Heaven would be released on 3 February 2023.

Artistry and influences

Goulding's music has been described as electropop, synth-pop, indie pop and folktronica. She is a soprano and is noted for her high piercing vibrato, breathy tone and emotive delivery. In a review for Halcyon, Neil McCormick of The Daily Telegraph described her voice as "something special", continuing; "Her tremulous vibrato and slightly hoarse timbre have the feel of something primal and folky, her birdlike high notes conveying a childlike wonder while darker tones imply ancient depths of sorrow. She sings like she is strung out on the melody, warbling from a place of desperate emotion. It really is that rarest and perhaps most accidental of gifts: an original voice". He then continued in regards to her vocal layering stating, "producer Jim Eliot puts her voice front, back and centre, banking up choral walls of vibrato, fashioning hooks from cut up samples of chirrups and chants, and creating unusual textures from trills and warbles". During an interview with Carson Daly, Goulding described her own voice saying;

Will Hermes of Rolling Stone compared her voice to that of Dolly Parton, stating that her upper register was dazzling whilst also complementing her skill in vocal multi-layering. Megan Farokhmanesh of Paste magazine stated "Goulding has a lovely voice, but occasionally her soprano-strung vocals hit a note that rubs the eardrums the wrong way" although she praised Goulding overall for her "talent for gorgeous high heart-tugging vocals".

Goulding has listed Joni Mitchell, Kate Bush, and Björk as influences, as well as contemporaries such as Amy Winehouse, Katy Perry, Lady Gaga, Beyoncé, Burial, Taylor Swift, Bon Iver, and Rihanna. She also expressed admiration for rappers Kanye West, Drake and Nicki Minaj. Goulding's musical style has been compared to that of Kate Nash, Lykke Li and Tracey Thorn.

Goulding's debut album Lights (2010) experimented with genres including indie pop, synthpop, folktronica and indietronica. The album contained "sparkling pop with a folky heart and an electronic edge" and was noted as being infectious. The album incorporated "acoustic guitar" and "retro-synthpop" compared to that of Little Boots and La Roux, while the production contained "folkie origins under a welter of busily cycling synths and programmed beats". Goulding toured the United Kingdom with American folk singer Lissie in 2010. Goulding's second album Halcyon followed in the same vein, including genres such as indie pop, synthpop and dream pop. She stepped away from the electronic sound of her previous album and moved to a more tribal and anthemic sound containing a bit more piano and vocal.

Personal life
Goulding ran the inaugural Nike Women Half Marathon in Washington, D.C. on 28 April 2013, earning a time of 1:41:35.

She dated English radio DJ Greg James in 2010. Their relationship ended in 2012 after 18 months together. In the same year, after collaborating on a song called "Bittersweet" for the Twilight: Breaking Dawn Part Two soundtrack, Goulding started dating DJ Skrillex. The two split nine months later, citing the long distance nature of their relationship. Goulding later was in a relationship with actor Jeremy Irvine. They broke up in August 2013. Goulding was in a relationship with Dougie Poynter of McFly between 2014 and 2016.

On 7 August 2018, Goulding and her boyfriend Caspar Jopling announced their engagement. The couple were married at York Minster on 31 August 2019 and Goulding was baptised in order to get married. Jopling is the grandson of former Conservative MP Michael Jopling, who was the Minister of Agriculture, Fisheries and Food from 1983 to 1987. In February 2021, Goulding announced that she and Jopling were expecting their first child. She gave birth in April 2021.

Goulding's best friend and personal assistant is Hannah Suzanne Lowe; the song "Army" was dedicated to Lowe and to Goulding's fans. On Michael McIntyre's Big Show, she revealed that she is also close friends with Princess Beatrice of York.

Goulding has spoken several times about her experience with mental health conditions. In 2016, she discussed panic attacks caused by the studio environment that prevented her from working. In 2017, she discussed ongoing confidence issues and severe anxiety she had experienced. She spoke of an increased confidence within herself which reduces the nervous flutters she experiences. She has said that a fitness regime and boxing at the gym has helped her overcome panic attacks and anxiety.

Goulding is a former vegan.

Other ventures

Philanthropy

In 2010, Goulding participated in the Bupa Great North Run for the British Heart Foundation. In 2011, Goulding ran the She Runs LA event for charity Students Run LA, which aims to increase access to sport for less privileged children across the Los Angeles Unified School District.

In 2012, she partnered with Pandora Radio, one dollar for each sale of her mixtape was donated to the Free the Children charity. On 1 June 2013, Goulding performed at Gucci's global concert event in London whose campaign "Chime for Change" aims to raise awareness of women's issues in terms of education, health and justice.

Goulding has frequently contributed to the BBC's annual charity telethon Children in Need in the UK. In 2013, Goulding's track "How Long Will I Love You" was the official single for the 2013 Children in Need campaign.

On 15 November 2014, Goulding joined the charity group Band Aid 30 along with other British and Irish pop acts, recording a new version of the track "Do They Know It's Christmas?" at Sarm West Studios in Notting Hill, London, to raise money for the 2014 Ebola crisis in West Africa.

Goulding is also a supporter for helping the homeless. She has performed in the annual charity concerts for the "Streets of London" charity event at the Royal Albert Hall from years 2014 to 2018 consecutively. On 24 December 2015, Goulding volunteered in central London at the Marylebone Project to help end homelessness and to assist in the elimination of the stereotype associated with the homeless population. She said, "It's that stigma of what a homeless person is — they abuse drugs or abuse alcohol. It's just not true, some people come from very normal backgrounds, very normal situations and something goes wrong. It can happen to all of us." As a patron of the Marylebone Project, Goulding attended the opening of a 24-hour drop-in centre for homeless women in London in November 2021.

In October 2017, she was recognised with a Global Leadership Award by the United Nations Foundation for her environmental and social justice activism. She also announced that she would join the foundation in 2018 as a Goodwill Ambassador.

Endorsements
Goulding contributed her vocals to an advert for the British department store chain John Lewis in 2010. The John Lewis Christmas advert has become an annual tradition in British culture and one of the signals that the countdown to Christmas has begun in the UK, with Goulding performing "Your Song" for the store's 2010 campaign.

In 2013, Goulding was announced as one of several new models for Marks & Spencer's 'Womanism' campaign. Subtitled "Britain's leading ladies", the campaign saw Goulding appear alongside British women from various fields, including the actress Helen Mirren, double Olympic gold medal-winning boxer Nicola Adams, and writer Monica Ali.

Goulding is endorsing the Swiss shampoo Pantene Pro-V on television and on the official Pantene website under the tagline "Strong Is Beautiful". This campaign has been running since 21 March 2016.

Accolades and achievements 

Goulding has won several awards during her music career, such as two Brit Awards, a Billboard Music Award, the BBC Sound Of... poll, 17 BMI London Awards, two Glamour Awards, an iHeartRadio Music Award, one MTV Italian Music Award, an NRJ Music Award, a People's Choice Award, an Q Award, a Teen Choice Award and a Variety Hitmakers Award. Alongside those accolades, she has been nominated for numerous major music awards including, a Grammy Award nomination for Best Pop Solo Performance, a Danish Music Award, a Latin American Music Award, three Global Awards, three MTV Video Music Award, six MTV Europe Music Awards, and ten World Music Awards.

In 2019, after ten years of consistent work as a hitmaker, She was honored with the Variety Hitmakers Decade Award,  with Goulding stating: "It's probably the first time I've really been acknowledged for this work". Meanwhile, in recognition as a songwriter she was presented with the BMI President's Award at the 2022 BMI London Awards ceremony.

Discography

 Lights (2010)
 Halcyon (2012)
 Delirium (2015)
 Brightest Blue (2020)
 Higher Than Heaven (2023)

Concert tours

Headlining
 The Lights Tour (2010)
 The Halcyon Days Tour (2012–14)
 Delirium World Tour (2016–17)
 Brightest Blue Tour (2021)

Supporting
Katy Perry – California Dreams Tour (2011)
Bruno Mars – Moonshine Jungle Tour (2013)
 Opening Ceremony of Expo 2020 (2021)

Filmography

Bibliography
 Fitter. Calmer. Stronger. (2021)

References

External links

 
 
 

 
1986 births
21st-century English women singers
21st-century English singers
Alumni of the University of Kent
Brit Award winners
Electropop musicians
English women singer-songwriters
British indie pop musicians
English electronic musicians
English women pop singers
English sopranos
Folktronica musicians
Homelessness activists
Interscope Records artists
Living people
Musicians from Herefordshire
Musicians from Kent
People from Hereford
Polydor Records artists
Synth-pop singers
English women in electronic music